Schneewittchen (Snow White) is an opera by Heinz Holliger. He wrote the libretto based on a poetic text by Robert Walser in iambic trimeter. The opera received its première on 17 October 1998 at the Zurich Opera House which had commissioned the work. The work is a psychoanalytical reworking of the fairy tale, analysing the complex relationships between the roles. It is not a children's opera.

Roles

Scenes
 Prologue
 Scene 1
 Interlude 1-2 (Invention)
 Scene 2, part 1
 Fughetta (In Nomine Fluminis)
 Scene 2, part 2
 Interlude 2-3
 Quasi Fuga
 Scene 3
 Interlude 3-4
 Scene 4
 Interlude 4-5
 Scene 5
 Epilogue (Choral variations)

External links
Performance details (orchestration, roles, etc.)
Review of a concert performance, Vienna, 25-Nov-2002 (in German)
  Schneewittchen Ballett

German-language operas
Operas
1998 operas
Works based on Snow White
Operas based on fairy tales